Ian Ironside (born 8 March 1964) is an English retired football goalkeeper, who spent most of his playing career at Scarborough but since retiring has returned to Sheffield and is now working as a joiner. His son Joe Ironside is a striker for Cambridge United.

References

1964 births
Living people
Footballers from Sheffield
English footballers
Association football goalkeepers
Barnsley F.C. players
North Ferriby United A.F.C. players
Scarborough F.C. players
Middlesbrough F.C. players
Stockport County F.C. players
Oldham Athletic A.F.C. players
Worksop Town F.C. players
Premier League players
English Football League players